The Bund Deutscher Segler (BDS) was the governing body of the Deutscher Turn- und Sportbund for sailing sports in the German Democratic Republic (GDR). It was founded in East Berlin in April of 1958 and merged with the German Sailing Federation after German reunification in early 1991. By 1988 it had 31,318 members and 2,231 trainers across the GDR.

Presidents of the BDS

References

Sports governing bodies in East Germany
Sports organizations established in 1958
Organizations disestablished in 1991
1958 establishments in East Germany
1991 disestablishments in Germany